James Gibbs was an architect.

James Gibbs may also refer to:

James A. Gibbs (1922–2010), author, lighthouse keeper, and maritime historian
James Edward Allen Gibbs (1829–1902), farmer, inventor, and businessman in Virginia
Jim Gibbs, rugby player

See also

Gibbs (surname)
James Gibb (disambiguation)
James (disambiguation)
Gibbs (disambiguation)